Esther Erb Atkins (born April 20, 1986) is an American long-distance runner. She competed in the marathon event at the 2015 World Championships in Athletics in Beijing, China.

Major races
Erb placed 24th in the marathon event at the 2015 World Championships in Athletics in Beijing, China.

Erb won the 2014 USA Marathon Championships and qualified for the 2016 U.S. Olympic Trials in Los Angeles, California.
 
Erb placed 27th in the U.S. Olympic Marathon Trials on January 14, 2012 in Houston, and 11th in the U.S. Olympic Marathon Trials on February 13, 2016 in Los Angeles.

Collegiate career
Erb was an NCAA Division III 10,000M champion, six time NCAA All-American and two-time Academic All-American while competing at Case Western Reserve University. After graduating from Case Western, she spent two years as a Fulbright teaching fellow in Austria.

Erb was a professional runner from ZAP Fitness from 2010 - 2013.

Erb worked as an assistant cross country and distance coach at Rider University from 2013 - 2015. She joined the Appalachian State University athletics department in 2015.

References

External links
 

1986 births
Living people
American female long-distance runners
American female marathon runners
Case Western Reserve University alumni
World Athletics Championships athletes for the United States
Place of birth missing (living people)
Sportspeople from Richmond, Virginia
21st-century American women